Redžep Redžepovski (born 14 December 1962) is a retired Macedonian flyweight boxer, who won silver medal for Yugoslavia in the flyweight division (< 51 kg) at the 1984 Summer Olympics in Los Angeles, California. In the final he was defeated by Steve McCrory of the United States.

During the preliminary rounds of the 1984 Olympics, Redžepovski scored a controversial win over Australia's Jeff Fenech, a future World Champion in four weight divisions. Fenech was initially given the decision, but after intervention by the Olympic Boxing Committee and a total recount, the decision was reversed with Redžepovski being awarded the win. Many of the other boxers and those in the press felt that Fenech had been unfairly robbed of a chance to win an Olympic medal and most boxing writers noted how political amateur boxing was, especially at the Olympic Games.

Olympic results 
Defeated Sanguo Teraporn (Thailand) 3–2
Defeated Pat Clinton (Great Britain) KO 2
Defeated Jeff Fenech (Australia) 4–1
Defeated Ibrahim Bilali (Kenya) 5–0
Lost to Steve McCrory (United States) 1–4

External links
 databaseOlympics.com
 Profile on Serbian Olympic Committee

1962 births
Living people
Sportspeople from Kumanovo
Macedonian male boxers
Flyweight boxers
Olympic boxers of Yugoslavia
Boxers at the 1984 Summer Olympics
Olympic silver medalists for Yugoslavia
Olympic medalists in boxing
Yugoslav male boxers
Medalists at the 1984 Summer Olympics